Edmond Simeoni (6 August 1934 – 14 December 2018) was a Corsican doctor, politician and nationalist. He was the brother of Max Simeoni, Member of the European Parliament (MEP) from 1989 to 1994 and father of Gilles Simeoni.

Simeoni, together with his brother Max, were the leaders of the Aleria siege, which started the modern Corsican nationalism.

Biography 
Simeoni was born 6 August 1934 in Corte, Corsica. His father was Ferdinand Simeoni, who was the mayor of Lozzi. He grew up in Francardu and graduated at the Bastia High School. He studied medicine and specialized in gastroenterology.

Simeoni relocated in Bastia and practiced medicine there for several years. He died on 14 December 2018 at Ajaccio, Corsica. Thousands of Corsicans attended his funeral and a tribute that lasted for three days. At the time of his death, he was considered the most prominent Corsican political figure in the past 50 years.

Activism 
Edmond and Max Simeoni participated in the elections during the 1960s without much success. They then founded the Action Regionaliste Corse in 1967. The organization was banned in 1973 but was revived as the Azzione per a Rinascita Corsa (Action for a Reborn Corsica, ARC). Two years later, the Simeoni brothers led a group of 50 ARC militants and took over a French wine depot in Aleria.

Books 
 1975: Le Piège d’Aleria, édition Lattes
 1985: La Volonté d’être, éditions Albiana
 2003: Un combat pour la Corse, éditions Le Cherche Midi – Entretien avec Pierre Dottelonde
 2008: Lettre aux femmes corses, éditions DCL – stamparia Sammarcelli

Price 
 Coppieters 2018

References 

1934 births
2018 deaths
People from Haute-Corse
Corsican politicians
Corsican nationalists
Members of the Corsican Assembly